Ilari Ruuth (born 27 August 1990) is a Finnish footballer, who played most notably for Tampere United, in Veikkausliiga, the premier division of football in Finland. He is also a member of Finland national under-19 football team. Ruuth plays as a left back.

References

External links
 Ilari Ruuth on the Tampere United web page

1990 births
Living people
Finnish footballers
Tampere United players
Association football defenders